Benthem v Netherlands was a European Court of Human Rights case on the right to a fair trial. It concerned the grant of a permit by a municipal authority, with which the Dutch Government, then referred to as the Crown in legal cases, disagreed. Several legal proceedings were brought in respect of this permit, which were ultimately decided by the Government itself, under the  procedure ('Crown appeal').

The Court held that there was a violation of  ECHR.

Facts
Albert Benthem used to own and run a garage in Noordwolde, Netherlands. In , he applied to the municipal authorities for a permit to establish and maintain an installation for the delivery of liquefied petroleum gas (LPG), following the Nuisance Act (Hinderwet). After the application was made public, three neighbours were concerned about the safety of the installation. A regional health inspector recommended to deny Benthem's application. Despite the health inspector's advice, the permit was granted, albeit with several conditions to counter possible dangers.

The health inspector lodged an appeal with the Government, the so-called . The municipality informed Benthem of this appeal, but stated he could still erect his installation. The Council of State, after hearing both parties and seeking advice from the Director General for Environmental Protection, gave the Minister of Public Health the recommendation to refuse the licence. Consequently, the Government (the Crown) held that the permit should not have been granted and quashed it by royal decree.

During that time, Benthem had already established the LPG installation. The municipal authorities ordered him to cease operation. The municipal authorities eventually decided to close the installation themselves. An appeal against that second decision was quashed on formal grounds by the Council of State.

Benthem filed an application with the European Commission of Human Rights. He claimed that a dispute over civil rights and obligations was involved and his case should have been heard by an independent and impartial tribunal as guaranteed under the right to a fair trial of  ECHR. 

The Commission held that  of the Convention was not applicable to his case. Both the Government and Benthem appealed to the European Court of Human Rights. By that time, Benthem had been declared bankrupt.

Judgment
The Court held that there was a violation of  ECHR.

It first assessed the applicability of Article 6(1), namely whether the dispute at hand concerned the "determination of [the applicant's] civil rights and obligations". The Dutch Government argued that the case at hand did not, since it failed to relate directly to the conclusion of contracts, to the right to enjoy one's property (since the Nuisance Act conditions this right), or to the right to carry out business activities (since Benthem could continue to sell LPG on a different site presenting less risks). On the contrary, the case concerned a 'new' and provisional right created by means of a license, which the Crown could therefore reverse. These conclusions were shared by the Commission. On the contrary, the Court established the existence of a genuine and serious dispute that concerned the "actual existence" of the right to a permit, which affected Benthem's ability to exploit his installation. This right to a permit has a civil character, since it is closely associated to the applicant's right to use his possessions and the exercise of his commercial activities.

Secondly, the Court considered the proceedings in front of the Council of State and the proceedings in front of the Crown. The Government argued that the Council of State acted as a court because it examined all the aspects of the case and came to a decision (provided the likelihood that the Minister of Public Health would follow its recommendation to the letter). However, the Court assessed that the Council of State only provides advice without binding force and could therefore not fulfill the role of tribunal with regards to Article 6(1). As for the appeals the Crown, the Court considers them of administrative rather than judicial nature, since the royal decree is an administrative act not susceptible to review by a judicial body, and the appeals were not lodged to an independent body.

Thus, the Court held eleven votes to six that Article 6(1) was both applicable and violated, and Benthem had been denied a right to a fair trial.

External links 
 ECtHR October 23, 1985, No. 8848/80 (Benthem v Netherlands)

Article 6 of the European Convention on Human Rights
European Court of Human Rights cases involving the Netherlands